The First Presbyterian Church, also known as First Christian Church, in Girard, Kansas is a historic church at 202 N. Summit.  It was built in 1888 and added to the National Register in 2009.

The first building of the congregation was built in 1871, and was destroyed by a tornado in 1886.  The present church, a two-story masonry structure, was completed in 1887.

References

Presbyterian churches in Kansas
Churches on the National Register of Historic Places in Kansas
Romanesque Revival church buildings in Kansas
Churches completed in 1888
Churches in Crawford County, Kansas
National Register of Historic Places in Crawford County, Kansas
1888 establishments in Kansas